Traitor's Blood is a novel by Reginald Hill, the author best known for his Dalziel and Pascoe series of crime novels.

The novel, originally published in the UK in 1983, moves between Venezuela, England and Moscow and involves a disgraced peer, Lemuel Stanhope-Swift, sixth Viscount Bessacarr, and his attempt to return home to die.

References

Publication history
1983, London 
1986, Woodstock VT: Foul Play 
2009, New York: Felony & Mayhem Press 

1983 British novels
Novels by Reginald Hill
Novels set in Venezuela
Novels set in Moscow
William Collins, Sons books